The 3M22 Zircon also spelled as 3M22 Tsirkon (NATO reporting name: SS-N-33) is a scramjet powered maneuvering anti-ship hypersonic cruise missile produced by Russia, for the Russian Navy which has launch platforms on frigates and submarines.

History

The missile represents a further development of the Hypersonic Experimental Flying Vehicle (HELA) developed by NPO Mashinostroyeniya.

In April 2017, it was reported Zircon had reached a speed of  during a flight test. Zircon was again test-fired on 3 June 2017, almost a year earlier than had been announced by Russian officials. In November 2017, Colonel General Viktor Bondarev stated that the missile was already in service. Another flight test reportedly occurred on 10 December 2018, during which the missile demonstrated that it could attain a speed of Mach 8.
On 20 February 2019, Russian President Vladimir Putin claimed the missile can accelerate up to Mach 9 and destroy both sea and land targets within . By the year's end, on 24 December 2019, Putin stated that Zircon'''s land-based version was in development.

According to the commander in chief of the Russian Navy Nikolai Yevmenov, as of January 2020, Zircon was still in testing phase and despite the overall positive evaluation of the test program, still suffered from the "childhood diseases" (Russian idiom meaning "teething problems"). Modernized frigates are expected to be the first platform to receive the hypersonic missile, and the tests are to be continued in parallel with the Navy's armament with the Kalibr cruise missile. Yevmenov further stated Zircon is expected to enter service "in the coming years". In early January 2020, Zircon was first test-launched from the frigate  in the Barents Sea, and successfully hit a ground target in the Northern Urals, exceeding the distance of 500 km.

On 26 November 2020, the Russian Defense Ministry announced the successful test of a missile launched from Admiral Gorshkov in the White Sea, hitting a naval target 450 km away in the Barents Sea.

On 11 December 2020, the Russian Defense Ministry announced the successful test of a missile launched from Admiral Gorshkov in the White Sea, hitting a ground target 350 km away in the Arkhangelsk Region.

On 19 July 2021, the Russian Defense Ministry announced the successful test of a missile launched from Admiral Gorshkov in the White Sea, hitting a ground target 350 km away on the coast of the Barents Sea. The flight speed reached nearly Mach 7.

The flight tests of the missile from a coastal mount and a surface ship carrier were reportedly completed as of late September 2021 with over 10 launches performed.

On 4 October 2021, the Russian Defense Ministry announced the successful test of a missile launched from a nuclear submarine for the first time from a surfaced position. The Defense Ministry, which tested firing the Zircon missile from a warship in July, said that the nuclear submarine Severodvinsk fired the missile while deployed in the Barents Sea and had hit its chosen target.
Low-quality video footage released by the ministry showed the missile shooting upwards from a submarine, its glare lighting up the night sky and illuminating the water's surface. A second submerged launch from a depth of 40 m was reported later the same day. The next day it was reported that the missile's trials from the submarine have been completed.

A Zircon hypersonic missile test-launched from the Northern Fleet's frigate Admiral Flota Sovetskogo Soyuza Gorshkov struck a naval target in the White Sea with a direct hit, Russia's Defense Ministry reported on 18 November 2021.

The crew of the Northern Fleet frigate Admiral Gorshkov, as part of the completion of the cycle of tests of hypersonic missile weapons, fired another Zircon missile at a sea target on November 29 and another one at a coastal target on December 16. The Tsirkon hypersonic system was salvo-launched on December 24, 2021, and again launched on February 19, 2022. The program of state trials was reportedly completed with that launch.

On 18 July 2022, it was reported that Zircon would be adopted by the Russian Navy by the end of 2022.

On 31 July 2022, speaking in St Petersburg on Russia's Naval Day, President Vladimir Putin announced that the Black Sea Fleet would be equipped with Zircon anti-ship hypersonic cruise missiles "in the coming months".

Two contracts have been signed for the production of the missile - one in the summer of 2021 and one in the fall of 2022.

On 3 November 2022 TASS'' announced the design and manufacture of a prototype mobile ground vehicle launcher for the Tsirkon as part of a coastal defense missile system.

On 23 December 2022 Defense Minister Sergey Shoigu announced the reception by the Admiral Gorshkov frigate of a batch of Zircon missiles.

Design
Zircon is believed to be a maneuvering, winged hypersonic cruise missile with a lift-generating center body. A booster stage with solid-fuel engines accelerates it to supersonic speeds, after which a scramjet motor with liquid-fuel (JP-10 jet fuel) in the second stage accelerates it to hypersonic speeds.

Some internet sources even claim the range of missile can reach 1,000 - 2,000 km, depending on the type of target.

The high speed of the Zircon likely gives it better target-penetration characteristics than lighter subsonic cruise-missiles, such as Tomahawk. Being twice as heavy and almost eleven times as fast as Tomahawk, the Zircon has more than 242 times the on-cruise kinetic energy of a Tomahawk missile (≈9 gigajoules, or equal to 2,150 kg TNT explosive energy). Its claimed Mach 9 speed would mean that it cannot be intercepted by existing missile defence systems, and its precision would make it lethal to large targets such as aircraft carriers.

This has led to concerns that it could penetrate existing naval defense systems. Because it flies at hypersonic speeds within the atmosphere, air pressure in front of it forms a plasma cloud as it moves, absorbing radio waves and making it practically invisible to active radar systems (plasma stealth). However, this also blinds any radar or IR seeker on the missile. With plasma stealth, hypersonic-speed and sea skimming technique, intercepting a flying Zircon is extremely difficult, if at all feasible at the current level of technology. The final section of the trajectory is completed in minimal time (under 10 seconds), so the enemy will likely not have time to carry out all the necessary procedures to intercept it. Zircon exchanges information in flight and can be controlled by commands if necessary.

Deployment
  
Admiral Nakhimov is currently being modernised and is expected to start sea trials in 2023. The ship's P-700 Granit anti-ship missiles are being replaced with the 3S14 universal VLS cells capable of carrying the Oniks, Kalibr and Zircon anti-ship cruise missiles; the vessel is to be equipped with 72 such missiles. The other active Kirov-class ship, Pyotr Velikiy, will undergo a similar procedure. After completion of their refit, the ships could carry 40–80 anti-ship cruise missiles of different types. 

Other platforms which will receive Zircons are s (fitted with UKSK VLS cells during their construction), s, modernised s, and modernised s (Project 949AM).

Export
There are certain design similarities between Zircon and BrahMos-II, which have been noted by experts. Some experts have also postulated that the BrahMos-II might be an export version of the Zircon missile.

Operators 
 Russian Navy

See also

References

External links
 Hypersonic missile "Zircon" why NATO is afraid of new Russian weapons (Russian)
 Hunting in Russian "Zircon" (Russian)
 Russia's Invincible Weapons: Today, Tomorrow, Sometime, Never? (English)

Nuclear cruise missiles of Russia
NPO Mashinostroyeniya products
Surface-to-surface missiles
Air-to-surface missiles of Russia
Anti-ship missiles of Russia
Anti-ship cruise missiles of Russia
Hypersonic aircraft
Military equipment introduced in the 2010s